Bailey Bridge may refer to:

Bailey bridge, a type of bridge

Bailey Bridge (Walton on Trent), in the United Kingdom
Clay Wade Bailey Bridge, in the United States